Grahame Leslie McGifford (born 1 May 1955) is an English former footballer, who played at right-back for Huddersfield Town, Hull City, Port Vale and Northwich Victoria.

Career
McGifford started his career with Huddersfield Town in 1972. Manager Ian Greaves handed him his Second Division debut as a substitute in the 1972–73 season, after which the "Terriers" were relegated into the Third Division. He made 17 appearances in 1973–74 and 24 appearances in 1974–75, as Bobby Collins's only season in charge at Leeds Road saw the club slip into the Fourth Division for the first time. McGifford lost his first team place under new boss Tom Johnston, and played only three games in 1975–76. He spent the 1976–77 campaign with Hull City, but featured just once in the Second Division for John Kaye's "Tigers". He departed Boothferry Park for Vale Park in June 1977, when he dropped down a division to sign for Port Vale. A regular in the first half of the 1977–78 season, he made 20 league and seven cup appearances for the "Valiants", keeping his first team place despite manager Roy Sproson being replaced by Bobby Smith. However McGifford suffered a serious knee injury in December 1977, and was given a free transfer in May 1978 to Northern Premier League side Northwich Victoria. He later entered the finance industry and took up residence in Stockport.

Career statistics
Source:

References

1955 births
Living people
Footballers from Carshalton
English footballers
Association football defenders
Huddersfield Town A.F.C. players
Hull City A.F.C. players
Port Vale F.C. players
Northwich Victoria F.C. players
English Football League players
Northern Premier League players